Žarko Serafimovski (born 13 February 1971, in Skopje, SFR Yugoslavia) is a retired football midfielder from the present-day North Macedonia.

International career
Serafimovski made his debut for the Macedonian national team in a March 1994 friendly match against Slovenia, in which he immediately scored a goal, Macedonia's 5th goal ever in their second ever official match. He earned 34 caps and scored 3 goals in total. His final international was a September 2001 FIFA World Cup qualification match against Azerbaijan.

References

External links
 
 Profile at MacedonianFootball.com 
 Career history at Weltfussball.de

1971 births
Living people
Footballers from Skopje
Association football midfielders
Macedonian footballers
North Macedonia international footballers
FK Ljuboten players
FK Vardar players
BSC Young Boys players
FK Makedonija Gjorče Petrov players
Trabzonspor footballers
Hapoel Be'er Sheva F.C. players
PFC Lokomotiv Plovdiv players
FK Renova players
Macedonian First Football League players
Swiss Super League players
Swiss Challenge League players
Süper Lig players
Israeli Premier League players
First Professional Football League (Bulgaria) players
Macedonian expatriate footballers
Expatriate footballers in Switzerland
Macedonian expatriate sportspeople in Switzerland
Expatriate footballers in Turkey
Macedonian expatriate sportspeople in Turkey
Expatriate footballers in Israel
Macedonian expatriate sportspeople in Israel
Expatriate footballers in Bulgaria
Macedonian expatriate sportspeople in Bulgaria